Rui Ramos (born 9 July 1930) is a Portuguese former athlete. He competed in the men's triple jump at the 1952 Summer Olympics.

References

External links
 

1930 births
Possibly living people
Athletes (track and field) at the 1952 Summer Olympics
Portuguese male triple jumpers
Olympic athletes of Portugal